Clair Huffaker (September 26, 1926 – April 3, 1990) was an American screenwriter and author of westerns and other fiction, many of which were turned into films.

Biography
Born in Magna, Utah, Huffaker wrote of his childhood in One Time I Saw Morning Come Home. He attended Princeton and Columbia universities and the Sorbonne in Paris. He served in the United States Navy in World War II and then studied in Europe before returning to America. After the war, he worked in Chicago as an assistant editor for Time before turning to fiction.

Novels

Badge for a Gunfighter (1957)
Rider from Thunder Mountain (1957)
Cowboy (1958) Novelization of the screenplay
Flaming Lance (filmed as Flaming Star) (1958)
Posse from Hell (1958)
Guns of Rio Conchos (1958)
Badman (filmed as The War Wagon) (1958)
Seven Ways from Sundown (1959)
Good Lord, You're Upside Down! (1963)
Nobody Loves a Drunken Indian (filmed as Flap (1967)
The Cowboy and the Cossack (1973)
One Time I Saw Morning Come Home (1974)
Clair Huffaker's Profiles of the American West (1976)

Screenplays

Seven Ways from Sundown (1960)
Flaming Star (1960)
Posse from Hell (1961)
The Comancheros (1961)
The Second Time Around (1961) as Cecil Dan Hansen
Rio Conchos (1964)
Tarzan and the Valley of Gold (1966)
The War Wagon (1967)
Hellfighters (1968)
100 Rifles (1969)
Flap (1970) 
The Deserter (1971) from a story by himself
Chino (1973) with others

Clair Huffaker also wrote scripts for television and was one of the writers on the Warner Brothers Western series Lawman

References

External links

1926 births
1990 deaths
United States Navy personnel of World War II
American male screenwriters
Western (genre) writers
20th-century American novelists
American male novelists
20th-century American male writers
People from Magna, Utah
20th-century American screenwriters